Kate Hill is a mountain in Greene County, New York. It is located in the Catskill Mountains southeast of East Windham. Mount Zoar is located west, and Windham High Peak is located south-southeast of Kate Hill.

References

Mountains of Greene County, New York
Mountains of New York (state)